The 2018–19 season of Atlético Petróleos de Luanda is the club's 38th season in the Girabola, the Angolan Premier football League and 38th consecutive season in the top flight of Angolan football. In 2019,  the club is participating in the Girabola, the Angola Cup and the CAF Confederation Cup.

Squad information

Players

Pre-season transfers

Mid-season transfers

Staff

Overview

Angolan League

League table

Results

Results summary

Results by round

Results overview

Match Details

CAF Confederation Cup

Group stage

Playoff round

First round

Preliminary round

Results summary

Angola Cup

Round of 16

Quarter finals

Semi finals

Season statistics

Appearances and goals

|-
! colspan="12" style="background:#DCDCDC; text-align:center" | Goalkeepers

|-
! colspan="12" style="background:#DCDCDC; text-align:center" | Defenders

|-
! colspan="12" style="background:#DCDCDC; text-align:center" | Midfielders

|-
! colspan="12" style="background:#DCDCDC; text-align:center" | Forwards

|-
! colspan=13 style=background:#DCDCDC; text-align:center| Players transferred out during the season

|-
! colspan="12" style="background:#DCDCDC; text-align:center" | Total

Scorers

Clean sheets

Season progress

See also
 List of Atlético Petróleos de Luanda players

External links
 PetroLuanda.co.ao Official club website 
 Match schedule
 Girabola.com profile
 Zerozero.pt profile
 Facebook profile

References

Atlético Petróleos de Luanda seasons
Petro de Luanda